Marcano's solenodon (Solenodon marcanoi) is an extinct species of mammal in the family Solenodontidae known only from skeletal remains found on the island of Hispaniola (today the Dominican Republic and Haiti).

Etymology
The specific epithet, marcanoi, is in honor of the Dominican botanist, entomologist, herpetologist, speleologist and researcher Eugenio de Jesús Marcano Fondeur.

Description
The species was smaller than the other extant member of its genus, the sympatric Hispaniolan solenodon (S. paradoxus). Marcano's solenodon limb bones were comparatively shorter than in S. paradoxus, suggesting smaller size and possibly short stature. Like its congenerics, it probably was a nocturnal, burrowing, shrew-like mammal with a long snout, that fed on insects, earthworms, small reptiles, birds, amphibians, and mammals.

History
The remains were found in association with those from rats of the genus Rattus, which suggests that Marcano's solenodon survived until the time of European colonization of the island, and may have gone extinct due to predation from introduced rodents.

References

Solenodon
Mammal extinctions since 1500
Venomous mammals
Mammals of the Dominican Republic
Mammals of Haiti
Endemic fauna of Hispaniola
Extinct animals of Haiti
Extinct animals of the Dominican Republic
Mammals described in 1962
Taxonomy articles created by Polbot